Fallston is a census-designated place (CDP) in Harford County, Maryland, United States. The population was 8,958 at the 2010 census, up from 8,427 in 2000. Fallston is a semi-rural community consisting mostly of farms and suburban-like developments.

Geography
Fallston is located in western Harford County at  (39.532006, −76.438021). It is bordered to the south by Baltimore County and to the northeast by the Bel Air North CDP. The Little Gunpowder Falls river forms the southern border of the Fallston CDP and the county line, while Winters Run forms the border with Bel Air North.

Maryland Route 152 is the main road through Fallston, leading southeast  to Interstate 95 at Exit 74 and northwest  to Maryland Route 146 near Jarrettsville. The original community of Fallston is in the southeastern part of the CDP on Old Fallston Road just southwest of MD 152, and the CDP extends northwest along MD 152 to Hess Road and Engle Road. Maryland Route 165 passes through the west side of the Fallston CDP, crossing MD 152 at Upper Crossroads, and leads north  to Jarrettsville and south four miles to Baldwin in Baltimore County.

Bon Air, Little Falls Meetinghouse and Rockdale are listed on the National Register of Historic Places.

Demographics

As of the census of 2000, there were 8,427 people, 2,875 households, and 2,550 families residing in the CDP. The racial makeup of the CDP was 97.33% White, 0.76% African American, 0.12% Native American, 1.10% Asian, 0.09% from other races, and 0.59% from two or more races including Hispanic or Latino.

There were 2,875 households, out of which 37.3% had children under the age of 18 living with them, 81.5% were married couples living together, 5.3% had a female householder with no husband present, and 11.3% were non-families. 9.6% of all households were made up of individuals, and 3.5% had someone living alone who was 65 years of age or older. The average household size was 2.93 and the average family size was 3.13.

In the CDP, the population was spread out, with 25.8% under the age of 18, 5.5% from 18 to 24, 23.0% from 25 to 44, 34.8% from 45 to 64, and 10.9% who were 65 years of age or older. The median age was 43 years. For every 100 females, there were 98.6 males. For every 100 females age 18 and over, there were 95.2 males.

The median income for a household in the CDP was $84,296, and the median income for a family was $87,686. Males had a median income of $62,112 versus $37,500 for females. The per capita income for the CDP was $31,093. About 2.2% of families and 2.3% of the population were below the poverty line, including 3.4% of those under age 18 and 2.4% of those age 65 or over.

Notable areas
Despite being mostly residential, the Humane Society of Harford County is located here.

Notable people
 Jim Hunter, broadcaster formerly with the Baltimore Orioles
 Fred Manfra, retired Orioles broadcaster
 Melvin Mora, retired Major League Baseball player
 Bill Ripken, former Orioles player, MLB Network commentator
 Gerry Sandusky, 11 News sportscaster WBAL-TV and Baltimore Ravens radio broadcaster

References

 
Census-designated places in Harford County, Maryland
Census-designated places in Maryland